Impressions of a Patch of Blue is a 1966 album by vibraphonist Walt Dickerson with keyboardist Sun Ra in a rare appearance as a sideman. It is based on themes from Jerry Goldsmith's score for the film A Patch of Blue (1965) starring Sidney Poitier. Sun Ra plays the harpsichord, an instrument rarely used in a jazz setting. It is the last album Dickerson recorded before his decade long sabbatical from jazz before his comeback in the mid-1970s.

Track listing 
"A Patch of Blue (Part 1)"
"A Patch of Blue (Part 2)"
"Bacon & Eggs"
"High Hopes"
"Alone in the Dark (Part 1)"
"Alone in the Dark (Part 2)"
"Selina's Fantasy"
"Thataway"

Personnel 
Walt Dickerson – vibraphone
Sun Ra – piano, harpsichord, celeste
Bob Cunningham – bass
Roger Blank – drums

References

1966 albums
MGM Records albums
Walt Dickerson albums
Sun Ra albums
Albums produced by Tom Wilson (record producer)